The Fort Garry Horse is a Canadian Army Reserve armoured regiment based in Winnipeg, Manitoba, Canada. It is part of 3rd Canadian Division's 38 Canadian Brigade Group. It traces its history to a cavalry regiment first formed in 1912 that first took up the name "Fort Garry" a year afterwards. Since that time the regiment has served in the First World War, sending men to battalions of the Canadian Expeditionary Force, and as an armoured regiment in the Second World War.

Lineage

Boulton's Mounted Infantry 
A unit name Boulton's Mounted Infantry was established in 1885. It was mobilised for active service on 10 April 1885 in the North-West Rebellion, and served with Middleton's Column of the North West Field Force until it was disbanded on 18 September 1885. In 1932, The Manitoba Horse Horse was granted the status of perpetuating Boulton's Mounted Infantry (see below).

The Fort Garry Horse 
The Fort Garry Horse itself originated in Winnipeg on 15 April 1912, as the 34th Regiment of Cavalry.  The following year it was re-designated the 34th Fort Garry Horse on 2 January 1913 and The Fort Garry Horse following the First World War on 15 March 1920. Winnipeg had originally been established as the expansionary outpost Fort Garry. On 15 December 1936, it was amalgamated with The Manitoba Horse. During the Second World War it was mobilised in the Canadian Active Service Force as a reconnaissance unit for the 2nd Canadian Infantry Division. The Fort Garry Horse, C.A.S.F., was later removed from the 2nd Division and converted to an armoured unit with the designation 10th Canadian Armoured Regiment (Fort Garry Horse). The Non-Permanent Active Militia component remaining in Canada was re-designated the 2nd Regiment, the Fort Garry Horse on 13 August 1940 and the 10th (Reserve) Armoured Regiment, (The Fort Garry Horse), on 1 April 1941. After the Second World War it was re-designated as the 10th Armoured Regiment (The Fort Garry Horse), on 31 January 1946, as The Fort Garry Horse (10th Armoured Regiment), on 4 February 1949; The Fort Garry Horse on 19 May 1958, the 2nd Fort Garry Horse on 11 October 1958, The Fort Garry Horse (Militia) on 1 January 1960 and finally The Fort Garry Horse on 16 June 1970, following the reduction to nil strength of the Regular Force regiment.

The Manitoba Horse 

The Manitoba Horse originated in Roblin, Manitoba on 1 April 1912, as the 32nd Light Horse. It was re-designated the 32nd Manitoba Horse on 2 November 1912 and, following the Great War as The Manitoba Horse on 15 March 1920. On 15 December 1936, it was amalgamated with the Fort Garry Horse.

Post-War 
On 11 October 1958, a Regular Force component was authorized as the 1st Fort Garry Horse. On 1 January 1960, it was re-designated The Fort Garry Horse. The regiment served in Canada, on NATO duty in West Germany and on United Nations duty in the Sinai and Cyprus. The Regular Force regiment was reduced to nil strength and placed on the Supplementary Order of Battle on 16 June 1970.

In 2003, the regiment began hosting personnel to help create a new unit of the Canadian Military Engineers.  On 14 April 2012, during the 100th anniversary celebrations of the FGH, the Engineer Squadron was stood up as 31 Engineer Squadron, part of 38 Combat Engineer Regiment. During their time as a sub-unit of the FGH, the engineers had the distinction of being the only reservists in Canada to wear the black beret of the Armoured Corps with the cap badge of the Canadian Military Engineers. , they wear the green beret in common with other engineer units.

The unit uses Mercedes Benz G-Wagon LUVW scout cars for reconnaissance vehicles and the Tactical Armoured Patrol Vehicle (TAPV).

Lineage Chart 
Lineage of the Fort Garry Horse:

Operational history

The Great War

Details from the 32nd Manitoba Horse and the 34th Fort Garry Horse were placed on active service on 6 August 1914 for local protection duties.

The 6th Battalion, Canadian Expeditionary Force, was organised in Winnipeg in August 1914. 10 officers and 224 men of the 34th FGH joined the battalion as well as members of the 20th Border Horse, 18th Mounted Rifles, 32nd Manitoba Horse, 15th Canadian Light Horse, and 22nd Saskatchewan Light Horse. The 6th battalion proceeded to England with the First Contingent in October 1914 and was part of the 2nd Brigade of the 1st Canadian Infantry Division, CEF. In March 1915, the 6th Battalion was removed from the 1st Canadian Division and re-roled to form the Canadian Cavalry Depot, to support the Canadian Cavalry Brigade in France.  The Canadian Cavalry Depot would provide the officers and men for the Fort Garry Horse CEF. Despite its connection with the 34th FGH, and FGH (CEF), the 6th Battalion was not perpetuated by the unit after the war. The perpetuation went to The Border Horse and is held by the XII Manitoba Dragoons, now on the Supplementary Order of Battle.

The Fort Garry Horse, CEF, was organised in England on 21 January 1916. It disembarked in France on 25 February 1916, where it fought in France and Flanders as part of the Canadian Cavalry Brigade until the end of the war. The regiment was disbanded on 6 November 1920. Harcus Strachan of the regiment was awarded the Victoria Cross for his actions at the battle of Cambrai on November 20, 1917, in France.

The regiment also mobilised the 34th Fort Garry Horse Overseas Training Depot, CEF, on 15 June 1917. It was re-designated the 34th Fort Garry Horse, Depot Squadron, CEF, on 1 January 1917 and embarked for Britain on 21 May 1917, where it provided reinforcements to the Canadian Corps in the field. The squadron was disbanded on 6 November 1920.

The 226th Battalion (Men of the North), CEF, was authorised on 15 July 1916 and embarked for Britain on 16 December 1916, where its personnel were absorbed by the 14th Reserve Battalion, CEF on 7 April 1917 to provide reinforcements for the Canadian Corps in the field. The battalion was disbanded on 27 July 1917. The Fort Garry Horse perpetuates both Boulton's Mounted Infantry of 1885 and the 226th Battalion.

The Second World War

The regiment mobilised The Fort Garry Horse, CASF, on 1 September 1939. It was re-designated as the 10th Armoured Regiment (The Fort Garry Horse), CASF, on 11 February 1941, the 10th Armoured Regiment (The Fort Garry Horse), CAC, CASF, on 15 October 1943 and the 10th Armoured Regiment (The Fort Garry Horse), RCAC, CASF, on 2 August 1945. The regiment embarked for Britain in November 1941.

The regiment landed in Normandy on 6 June 1944, as a part of the 2nd Canadian Armoured Brigade, in support of the 8th Canadian Infantry Brigade, 3rd Canadian Infantry Division, and fought in North-West Europe until the end of the war. The overseas regiment was disbanded on 31 January 1946.

Alliances 
 - The Royal Dragoon Guards

Battle honours

In the list below, battle honours in small capitals were awarded for participation in large operations and campaigns, while those in lowercase indicate honours granted for more specific battles. Battle honours in bold type are emblazoned on the guidon.
North West Rebellion

The Great War

The Second World War

War in Afghanistan

Other information 

 Facings: yellow
 Colours: regimental guidon, presented to the 2nd Fort Garry Horse (Militia) in 1963 and 1st Fort Garry Horse (Regular) in 1964.  When the regular force unit was disbanded, their Guidon was presented to the Lieutenant Governor of Manitoba for safekeeping. It remains on display in the Manitoba Legislative Building. The Guidon presented in 1963 is kept and still used by the unit.

Armoury
The Fort Garry Horse and the regimental museum are located in Lieutenant-Colonel Harcus Strachan, VC, MC Armoury (formerly called McGregor Armoury) at 551 Machray Avenue, Winnipeg, Manitoba. Designed by Herbert E. Matthews it is drill hall with Tudor-Revival façades built in 1914–5 The building was recognised in the Register of the Government of Canada Heritage Buildings in 1994.

Memorial Wall
Dedicated on 12 November 1995 to members of the Fort Garry Horse who have died on active service, a memorial wall incorporates the battle honours, the names of the deceased members (with the date of their death), an inscription, the regimental Guidon (Fort Garry gate and the regimental motto), and the cap badges used in 1914 and 1939.

A wall hanging in the Warrant Officer's and Sergeant's Mess incorporates two lances; the regimental cap badge; the regimental motto and the battle honours won during the North West Rebellion and the First and Second World Wars.

Monument at Masnières, France
On June 11, 2004, during a visit by Fort Garry Horse, a monumental stone was unveiled at Masnières, Northern France, to commemorate the charge by 'B' Squadron on 20 November 1917, the opening day of the Battle of Cambrai, and the actions of Lieut. Harcus Strachan during the charge, which earned him the Victoria Cross.

Plaques
Donated in May 1970, a plaque is dedicated to the members of the Fort Garry Horse who participated in the liberation of The Netherlands in 1944–45.

A plaque was dedicated to the members of the regiment who participated in the Normandy landings and the liberation of Bernières-sur-Mer in France.

A replica of a cairn at Saint Aubin-sur-Mer, dedicated to members of The Fort Garry Horse who landed on the beaches of Normandy on 6 June 1944 was constructed for the regiment in 1965.

Windows
Stained glass windows were removed from the Regimental Church in Hemer, West Germany and transported to Winnipeg as a memorial to the regiment's service in Europe from 1962 to 1966.

Vehicles
A Lynx reconnaissance vehicle, which was used in the Canadian military as an armoured reconnaissance and command vehicle, is on the grounds.

A Sherman M4A2, 76mm (W) HVSS tank which was used by Fort Garry Horse from 1946 to 1969 is on the grounds of the Armoury.

Order of Precedence

See also

 List of regiments of cavalry of the Canadian Militia (1900–1920)
 List of mounted regiments in the Canadian Expeditionary Force
 Military history of Canada
 History of the Canadian Army
 Canadian Forces
 List of armouries in Canada
 Winnie-the-Pooh was inspired by the bear acquired by Lt. Harry Colebourn, Veterinary Officer of the FGH before the war. See Winnipeg the Bear.

References
Notes

Bibliography
The Gate: A History of The Fort Garry Horse by Captain G. T. And Captain J. K. Marteinson Service (1971)
Facta Non Verba, A History of The Fort Garry Horse  by Michael R. McNorgan and Gordon T. Crossley (2012)
Vanguard : The Fort Garry Horse in the Second World War (1945, with reprints in 1972 and 1995)
The Fort Garry Horse C.A.S.F. (Allied with 4th/7th Dragoon Guards) Battle Honors by Anonymous (1939)
Standing Orders, Fort Garry Horse 1st. Canadian Contingent by Fort Garry Horse (1915)

External links
 
 The Fort Garry Horse Regimental Association

Fort Garry Horse
Armoured regiments of Canada
Cavalry regiments of Canada
Military units and formations established in 1913
Museums in Winnipeg
Organizations based in Winnipeg
1913 establishments in Manitoba
Military units and formations of Manitoba
Military units and formations of Canada in World War II
Mounted Regiments of the Canadian Expeditionary Force